The Monastery of St. Melania the Roman (Manastir Svete Melanije Rimljanke) is a Serbian Orthodox monastery located in the northeastern part of the city of Zrenjanin, in northern Serbia. It was founded in 1935 by the Bishop of Banat, Georgije Letić, built in the Byzantine ecclesiastical style. It was the first female monastery in Banat. The current bishop is Nikanor.

See also
List of Serb Orthodox monasteries

References

External links

20th-century Serbian Orthodox church buildings
20th-century Christian monasteries
1935 establishments in Serbia
Christian organizations established in 1935
Serbian Orthodox monasteries in Serbia
Serbian Orthodox monasteries in Vojvodina
Banat
Zrenjanin